In some models of phonology as well as morphophonology in the field of linguistics, the underlying representation (UR) or underlying form (UF) of a word or morpheme is the abstract form that a word or morpheme is postulated to have before any phonological rules have applied to it.  By contrast, a surface representation is the phonetic representation of the word or sound. The concept of an underlying representation is central to generative grammar.

If more phonological rules apply to the same underlying form, they can apply wholly independently of each other or in a feeding or counterbleeding order. The underlying representation of a morpheme is considered to be invariable across related forms (except in cases of suppletion), despite alternations among various allophones on the surface.

Examples
In many cases, the underlying form is simply the phonemic form. For example, in many varieties of American English, the phoneme  in a word like wet can surface either as an unreleased stop  or as a flap , depending on environment:  wet vs.  wetter. (In both cases, however, the underlying representation of the morpheme wet is the same: its phonemic form .)

Phonological rules may change the phonemes involved. In such cases, pipes ("|") or double slashes may be used in transcription to distinguish the underlying form from its phonemic realization. For example, the word "cats" has the phonemic representation . If it is assumed that the underlying form of the English plural suffix is a  sound, the underlying form of "cats" would be . (The  surfaces as an  because of the phonological process of devoicing after an unvoiced consonant.)

Sandhi, such as tone sandhi in Chinese, is another phonological process that changes the phonemes of a morpheme from its underlying form.

See also
Deep structure and surface structure
Phonotactics

References

Phonology